Cryptomnesia occurs when a forgotten memory returns without its being recognized as such by the subject, who believes it is something new and original. It is a memory bias whereby a person may falsely recall generating a thought, an idea, a tune, a name, or a joke, not deliberately engaging in plagiarism but rather experiencing a memory as if it were a new inspiration.

Early use

Cryptomnesia was first documented in 1874, involving the medium Stainton Moses, who during a séance believed himself to be in spiritual contact with two brothers from India who had recently been killed. Despite the apparent communication, he was unable to ascertain any details which had not already been given in newspaper coverage of the story the week before. Researchers concluded that Moses had read the story but forgotten that he had read it, instead mistaking the partial memory for a message from the spirit world.

The word was first used by the psychiatrist Théodore Flournoy, in reference to the case of medium Hélène Smith (Catherine-Élise Müller) to suggest the high incidence in psychism of "latent memories on the part of the medium that come out, sometimes greatly disfigured by a subliminal work of imagination or reasoning, as so often happens in our ordinary dreams."

Carl Gustav Jung treated the subject in his thesis "On the Psychology and Pathology of So-Called Occult Phenomena" (1902) and in an article, "Cryptomnesia" (1905), suggested the phenomenon in Friedrich Nietzsche's Thus Spoke Zarathustra. The idea was studied or mentioned by Géza Dukes, Sándor Ferenczi and Wilhelm Stekel as well as by Sigmund Freud in speaking of the originality of his inventions. Jacques Lacan illustrated the adaptability of the concept in his formulation of the ego ideal (the "ego" as Other) in refashioning the "case" of Margarite Pantaine (Case of Aimée). Her experiences of self-"misrecognition" provided a structure for Lacan's key subsequent theories of The Symbolic and the mirror stage.

The word cryptomnesia is a compound of Greek cryptos (hidden, concealed, secret) and mnesia (memory).

Experimental research
In the first empirical study of cryptomnesia, people in a group took turns generating category examples (e.g., kinds of birds: parrot, canary, etc.). They were later asked to create new exemplars in the same categories that were not previously produced, and also to recall which words they had personally generated. People inadvertently plagiarized about 3–9% of the time either by regenerating another person's thought or falsely recalling someone's thought as their own. Similar effects have been replicated using other tasks such as word search puzzles and in brainstorming sessions.

Causes
Cryptomnesia is more likely to occur when the ability to properly monitor sources is impaired. For example, people are more likely to falsely claim ideas as their own when they were under high cognitive load at the time they first considered the idea. Cryptomnesia increases when people are away from the original source of the idea, and decreases when participants are specifically instructed to pay attention to the origin of their ideas. False claims are also more prevalent for ideas originally suggested by persons of the same sex, presumably because the perceptual similarity of the self to a same-sex person exacerbates source confusion. In other studies it has been found that the timing of the idea is also important: if another person produces an idea immediately before the self produces an idea, the other's idea is more likely to be claimed as one's own, ostensibly because the person is too busy preparing for their own turn to properly monitor source information.

Value
As explained by Carl Jung,
in Man and His Symbols, "An author may be writing steadily to a preconceived plan, working out an argument or developing the line of a story, when he suddenly runs off at a tangent. Perhaps a fresh idea has occurred to him, or a different image, or a whole new sub-plot. If you ask him what prompted the digression, he will not be able to tell you. He may not even have noticed the change, though he has now produced material that is entirely fresh and apparently unknown to him before. Yet it can sometimes be shown convincingly that what he has written bears a striking similarity to the work of another author — a work that he believes he has never seen."

Jorge Luis Borges's story, "Pierre Menard, Author of the Quixote," is a meta-fictive enactment of cryptomnesia. This work is written in the form of a review or literary critical piece about (the nonexistent) Pierre Menard. It begins with a brief introduction and a listing of all of Menard's work.

Borges's "review" describes this 20th-century French writer who has made an effort to go further than mere "translation" of Don Quixote, but to immerse himself so thoroughly as to be able to actually "re-create" it, line for line, in the original 17th century Spanish. Thus, "Pierre Menard" is often used to raise questions and discussion about the nature of accurate translation or, in this case, the hermeneutics of cryptomnesia.

Cases

Nietzsche
Jung gives the following example in Man and His Symbols. Friedrich Nietzsche's book Thus Spoke Zarathustra includes an almost word for word account of an incident also included in a book published about 1835, half a century before Nietzsche wrote. This is considered to be neither purposeful plagiarism nor pure coincidence: Nietzsche's sister confirmed that he had indeed read the original account when he was younger, likely sometime between ages 12 and 15; Nietzsche's youthful intellectual capabilities, his later cognitive degeneration, and his accompanying psychological deterioration (specifically, his increasing grandiosity as manifested in his later behavior and writings) together strengthen the likelihood that he happened to commit the passage to memory upon initially reading it and later, after having lost his memory of encountering it, assumed that his own mind had created it.

Byron
In some cases, the line between cryptomnesia and zeitgeist (compare the concept of multiple discovery in science) may be somewhat hazy. Readers of Lord Byron's closet drama Manfred noted a strong resemblance to Goethe's Faust. In a review published in 1820, Goethe wrote, "Byron's tragedy Manfred was to me a wonderful phenomenon, and one that closely touched me. This singular intellectual poet has taken my Faustus to himself, and extracted from it the strangest nourishment for his hypochondriac humour. He has made use of the impelling principles in his own way, for his own purposes, so that no one of them remains the same; and it is particularly on this account that I cannot enough admire his genius." Byron was apparently thankful for the compliment; however, he claimed that he had
never read Faustus.

Barrie

J. M. Barrie, the creator of Peter Pan, was aware of the occurrence of cryptomnesia. In Peter and Wendy Wendy sews Peter's shadow back on and this makes him very happy but he immediately thinks he has attached the shadow himself:

"How clever I am," he crowed rapturously, "oh, the cleverness of me!"

Peter exhibits a number of other clinically accurate peculiarities of memory suggesting that Barrie regarded Peter's behavior as a memory disorder rather than self-centredness.

Keller
Helen Keller compromised her own and her teacher's credibility with an incident of cryptomnesia which was misinterpreted as plagiarism. The Frost King, which Keller wrote out of buried memories of the fairy tale The Frost Fairies by Margaret Canby, read to her four years previously, left Keller a nervous wreck, and unable to write fiction for the rest of her life.

Stevenson
Robert Louis Stevenson refers to an incident of cryptomnesia that took place during the writing of Treasure Island, and that he discovered to his embarrassment several years afterward:

Jerusalem of Gold
Jerusalem of Gold is a 1967 song by Naomi Shemer.
Some of the song's melody is based on a Basque lullaby, Pello Joxepe, composed by Juan Francisco Petriarena 'Xenpelar' (1835–1869). Shemer heard a rendition by Spanish singer/songwriter Paco Ibáñez, who visited Israel in 1962 and performed the song to a group that included her and Nehama Hendel. She later acknowledged hearing Hendel perform Pello Joxepe in the mid-1960s, and that she had unconsciously based some of the melody on the lullaby. Shemer felt very bad when she found that it was similar to Pello Joxepe, but when Ibáñez was asked how he felt about the issue, he replied he was "glad it helped in some way", and that he was not angry, nor did he perceive it as plagiarism.

Tyler
In 1984, when Aerosmith were recording Done With Mirrors, lead singer Steven Tyler heard the group's "You See Me Crying" on the radio and, not remembering that it was their own song, suggested that the group record a cover version, to which guitarist Joe Perry replied, "That's us, fuckhead!".

Harrison
The precedent in United States copyright law, since 1976, has been to treat alleged cryptomnesia no differently from deliberate plagiarism. The seminal case is Bright Tunes Music v. Harrisongs Music, where the publisher of "He's So Fine," written and composed by Ronald Mack, demonstrated to the court that George Harrison borrowed substantial portions of his song "My Sweet Lord" from "He's So Fine." The Court imposed damages despite a claim that the copying was subconscious. The ruling was upheld by the Second Circuit in ABKCO Music v. Harrisongs Music, and the case Three Boys Music v. Michael Bolton, upheld by the Ninth Circuit, affirmed the principle.

McCullough

In 1987, Australian author Colleen McCullough published a novella, The Ladies of Missalonghi. Critics alleged that she had plagiarised The Blue Castle, a 1926 novel by L. M. Montgomery. McCullough acknowledged having read Montgomery's works in her youth, but attributed the similarities to subconscious recollection.

Eco
In Interpretation and Overinterpretation, Umberto Eco describes the rediscovery of an antique book among his large collection, which was eerily similar to the pivotal object in his novel The Name of the Rose.

See also
 Anybody Seen My Baby?
 Automatic writing
 Bridey Murphy
 Confabulation
 Déjà vu
 False memory
 Hindsight bias
 Jamais vu
 Joke theft
 Melancholy Elephants
 Minority influence
 Misattribution of memory
 Revelation
 Source amnesia

References

External links
Cryptomnesia - The Skeptic's Dictionary

Analytical psychology
Memory
Plagiarism
Error
Memory biases